The 1978 Oregon gubernatorial election took place on November 7, 1978. In a rematch of the 1974 contest, Republican nominee Victor Atiyeh defeated Democratic incumbent Robert Straub to win the election.

, this was the most recent Oregon gubernatorial election in which both candidates are now deceased.

Candidates

Democratic
 Robert W. Straub, incumbent Governor of Oregon

Republican
 Victor G. Atiyeh, State senator and nominee in 1974
 Tom McCall, former Governor of Oregon
 Roger E. Martin, State Representative

Election results

References

1978
Gubernatorial
Oregon
November 1978 events in the United States